The Cathedral of Saint Mary of the See,  better known as Seville Cathedral, is a Roman Catholic cathedral in Seville, Andalusia, Spain. It was registered in 1987 by UNESCO as a World Heritage Site, along with the adjoining Alcázar palace complex and the General Archive of the Indies. It is one of the largest churches in the world as well as the largest Gothic church.

After its completion in the early 16th century, Seville Cathedral supplanted Hagia Sophia as the largest cathedral in the world, a title the Byzantine church had held for a thousand years.

Seville Cathedral was the site of the baptism of Infante Juan of Aragon in 1478, only son of the Catholic Monarchs Ferdinand II of Aragon and Isabella I of Castile. Its royal chapel holds the remains of the city's conqueror, Ferdinand III of Castile, his son and heir, Alfonso the Wise, and their descendant, King Peter the Cruel. The funerary monuments for cardinals Juan de Cervantes and Pedro González de Mendoza are located among its chapels. Christopher Columbus and his son Diego are also buried in the cathedral.

The Archbishop's Palace is located on the northeastern side of the cathedral.

Construction and history

Almohad mosque (1172–1248) 
The Almohad caliph Abu Yaqub Yusuf ordered the construction of a new grand mosque for the city in 1172 on the south end of the city. The new mosque was dedicated in 1182, but was not completed until 1198. It supplanted the one built between 829 and 830 by Umar Ibn Adabbas on the site of the present-day collegiate church of Divino Salvador as the main prayer hall in the city. Its prayer hall consisted of seventeen aisles oriented southward, perpendicular to its Qibla wall, in the manner of many mosques of Al-Andalus, including the mosque of Ibn Adabbas.

"Christianized mosque" (1248–1434) 
Shortly after Seville's conquest by Ferdinand III, Yaqub Yusuf's mosque was converted into the city's cathedral. Its orientation was changed and its spaces partitioned and adorned to suit Christian worship practices. The internal space was gradually divided into chapels by constructing walls in the bays along the northern and southern walls. Almost the entire eastern half of the cathedral was occupied by the royal chapel that would hold the bodies of Ferdinand, his wife and Alfonso the Wise.

Gothic cathedral (1434–1506, 1511–1517) 

Seville Cathedral was built to demonstrate the city's wealth, as it had become a major trading center in the years after the Reconquista in 1248. In July 1401, city leaders decided to build a new cathedral to replace the grand mosque that served as the cathedral until then. According to local oral tradition, the members of the cathedral chapter said: "Hagamos una Iglesia tan hermosa y tan grandiosa que los que la vieren labrada nos tengan por locos" ("Let us build a church so beautiful and so grand that those who see it finished will take us for mad"). The actual entry from 8 July 1401, recorded among others by Juan Cean Bermudes in 1801 but now lost, proposed building "una tal y tan buena, que no haya otra su igual" ("one so good that none will be its equal). Construction continued until 1506. The clergy of the parish offered half their stipends to pay for architects, artists, stained glass artisans, masons, carvers, craftsman and labourers and other expenses. Several factors, including royal resistance to the temporary relocation of the royal chapel delayed the start of construction until 1434. On that year, king John II of Castille allowed the temporary transportation of the royal bodies to the cathedral's cloister for storage.

Five years after construction ended, in 1511, the crossing lantern collapsed and work on the cathedral recommenced. The crossing again collapsed in 1888, and work on the dome continued until at least 1903. The 1888 collapse occurred due to an earthquake and resulted in the destruction of "every precious object below" the dome at that time.

Description 

The interior has the longest nave of any cathedral in Spain. In the main body of the cathedral, the most noticeable features are the great boxlike choir loft, which fills the central portion of the nave, and the vast Gothic retablo of carved scenes from the life of Christ. This altarpiece was the lifetime work of a single craftsman, Pierre Dancart.

The builders preserved some elements from the ancient mosque. The mosque's sahn, that is, the courtyard for ablutions for the faithful to conduct their ritual cleansing before entering the prayer hall is known today as the Patio de los Naranjos. It contains a fountain and orange trees. However, the most well known is its minaret, which was converted into a bell tower known as La Giralda, and is now the city's most well-known symbol.

Giralda

The Giralda is the bell tower of the Cathedral of Seville. The Giralda is the former minaret of the mosque that stood on the site under Muslim rule, and was built to resemble the minaret of the Koutoubia Mosque in Marrakech, Morocco. It was converted into a bell tower for the cathedral after the Reconquista, although the topmost section dates from the Renaissance. It was registered in 1987 as a World Heritage Site by UNESCO. The tower is 104.5 m in height and was one of the most important symbols in the medieval city. Construction began in 1184 under the direction of architect Ben Ahmad Baso. According to the chronicler Ibn Sahib al-Salah, the works were completed on 10 March 1198, with the placement of four gilt bronze balls in the top section of the tower. After a strong earthquake in 1365, the spheres were missing. In the 16th century the belfry was added by the architect Hernán Ruiz the Younger, which hides the Almohad lantern; the statue on its top, called "El Giraldillo", was installed in 1568 to represent the triumph of the Christian faith.

Doors
Seville Cathedral has fifteen doors on its four facades. The major doors are:

West facade
The Door of Baptism, on the left side, was built in the 15th century and decorated with a scene depicting the baptism of Jesus, created by the workshop of Lorenzo Mercadante of Brittany. It is of Gothic style with a pointed archivolt decorated with tracery. It contains sculptures of the brothers Saint Isidore and Saint Leander and the sisters Saints Justa and Rufina, by Lorenzo Mecadante, also a series of angels and prophets by the artisan Pedro Millán.
The Main Door or Door of Assumption, in the center of the west facade, is well-preserved and elaborately decorated. Cardinal Cienfuegos y Jovellanos commissioned the artist Ricardo Bellver to carve the relief of the Assumption over the door; it was executed between 1877 and 1898.

The Door of Saint Michael or Door of the Nativity, has sculptures representing the birth of Jesus by Pedro Millán. It was built in the 15th century and is decorated with terracotta sculptures of Saint Laurean, Saint Hermengild and the Four Evangelists. Today, this door is used for the Holy Week processions.

South facade
The Door of Saint Cristopher or De la Lonja (1887–1895) of the south transept, was designed by Adolfo Fernandez Casanova and completed in 1917; it was originally designed by the architect Demetrio de los Rios in 1866. A replica of the "Giraldillo" stands in front of its gate.

North facade

The Door of the Conception (1895–1927, Puerta de la Concepción) opens onto the Court of the Oranges (Patio de los Naranjos) and is kept closed except on festival days. It was designed by Demetrio de los Rios and finished by Adolfo Fernandez Casanova in 1895. It was built in the Gothic style to harmonize with the rest of the building.

The Door of the Lizard (Puerta del Lagarto) leads from the Court of the Oranges; it is named for the stuffed crocodile hanging from the ceiling.

The Door of the Sanctuary (Puerta del Sagrario) provides access to the sanctuary. Designed by Pedro Sanchez Falconete in the last third of the 17th century, it is framed by Corinthian columns with a sculpture on top representing King Ferdinand III of Castile next to the Saints Isidore, Leander, Justa and Rufina.

Door of Forgiveness (Puerta del Perdón) gives access to the Patio de los Naranjos (Patio of the Oranges) from Calle Alemanes and therefore is not really a door of the cathedral. It belonged to the ancient mosque and retains its horseshoe arch shape from that time. In the early 16th century it was adorned with terracotta sculptures by the sculptor Miguel Perrin, highlighting the great relief of the Purification on the entrance arch. The plaster ornaments were made by Bartolomé López.

East facade
The Door of Sticks or the Adoration of the Magi (Puerta de Palos or Puerta de la Adoración de los Magos) decorated with sculptures by Lope Marin in 1548, has a relief of the Adoration of the Magi at the top, executed by Miguel Perrin in 1520. The name "Palos" or "Sticks" is due to the wooden railing which separates that area from the rest of the building.

Door of the Bells (Puerta de las Campanillas) was so named because at the time of its construction the bells to call the workers were rung there. The Renaissance sculptures and the relief on the tympanum representing Christ's Entry into Jerusalem were made by Lope Marin in 1548.

Chapels

The cathedral has 80 chapels, including the Capilla Real. It was reported in 1896 that 500 masses were said daily in the chapels. The baptistery Chapel of Saint Anthony contains the painting of The Vision of St. Anthony (1656) by Bartolomé Esteban Murillo. In November 1874, it was discovered that thieves had cut out the portion depicting Saint Anthony. Then, in January 1875, a Spanish immigrant attempted to sell the same fragment to a New York City art gallery. The man stated it was a complete original by Murillo, Saint Anthony being one of the artist's favorite subjects. The owner of the gallery, Hermann Schaus, negotiated a price of $250 and contacted the Spanish consulate. Upon securing the sale, Schaus sent it to the Spanish Consulate, which shipped it to Seville via Havana and Cadiz. It was returned to the cathedral and added back into the work in 1875 by the restorer Salvador Martínez Cubells.

Organ 
The cathedral originally hosted a pair of historic instruments: a Gospel organ by Jordi Bosch, finished in 1793, and an Epistle organ by Valentín and José Valentín Verdalonga, finished in 1831. Neither survived the 1888 earthquake. They were replaced in 1901–1903 with twin organs by Aquilino Amezua. These were converted to electrical control in 1973 and are now played from a single four-manual console on the floor between them. The organ was then reworked by Gerhard Grenzing in 1996, adding some more traditional Baroque capabilities to this romantic-symphonic instrument.

Timeline

 1184 – Construction of the Almohad mosque begun
 1198 – Completion of the mosque
 1248 – Conquest of Seville by Ferdinand III, the mosque Christianized
 1356 and 1362 – Two earthquakes destroy minaret, replaced by bell gable
 1401 – (8 July- Harvey 230) Decision made to replace former mosque
 1402 – Nave begun- SW corner
 1432 – Nave completed, east end started
 1466 – Demolition of Royal Chapel authorized by Juan II of Castile
 1467 – East end completed, vaults begun. Anchors added.
 1475 – Stalls begun
 1478 – Stalls completed
 1481 – Doorways in high altar completed
 1482 – Retablo (altarpiece) begun
 1498 – Vaults completed, lantern begun
 1506 – Main dome (lantern) completed
 1511 – Lantern collapses, rebuilding begins
 1515 – New choir vaults completed
 1517 – New transept vaults completed
 1519 – Lantern rebuilding completed
 1526 – Retablo Mayor completed
 1551 – Capilla Real begun
 1558 – Belfry replaces bell gable
 1568 – Giralda, top stages
 1575 – Capilla Real completed
 1593 – Chapterhouse (Sala Capitular) completed
 1793 – Epistle organ finished
 1831 – Gospel organ finished
 1888 – Main dome and vaults collapse

Burials

 Christopher Columbus
 Ferdinand Columbus
 Fernando III of Castile
 Elisabeth of Hohenstaufen
 Alfonso X of Castile
 Pedro I of Castile
María Díaz de Padilla
Alfonso the Pigeon

See also
 12 Treasures of Spain
 History of early modern period domes

Gallery

References

Sources

External links

 Interactive 360° panorama from Plaza del Triunfo with Cathedral, Alcázar and Archivo General de Indias (Java, highres, 0,9 MB)
 View of front from air and 41 photos (Google).
 Website with detailed information about Seville Cathedral
 Website showcasing sacred destinations including Seville Cathedral
 UNESCO list of World Heritage Monuments
 City Guide Website of Andalucia with information about Seville Cathedral
 Information on Seville_Cathedral
 Details of Seville Cathedral as a national monument of Spain
 Travel Guide information regarding Seville Cathedral
 Great Building Website with details about Seville Cathedral
 Images pertaining to Seville Cathedral
 Bluffton University images and details pertaining to Catedral de Sevilla

Roman Catholic churches completed in 1506
Cathedral
Roman Catholic cathedrals in Andalusia
World Heritage Sites in Spain
Conversion of non-Christian religious buildings and structures into churches
15th-century Roman Catholic church buildings in Spain
Former mosques in Spain
Gothic architecture in Andalusia
Bien de Interés Cultural landmarks in the Province of Seville
Buildings converted to Catholic church buildings